A coastal submarine or littoral submarine is a small, maneuverable submarine with shallow draft well suited to navigation of coastal channels and harbors. Although size is not precisely defined, coastal submarines are larger than midget submarines, but smaller than sea-going submarines designed for longer patrols on the open ocean. Space limitations aboard coastal submarines restrict fuel availability for distant travel, food availability for extended patrol duration, and number of weapons carried. Within those limitations, however, coastal submarines may be able to reach areas inaccessible to larger submarines, and be more difficult to detect.

History
The earliest submarines were effectively coastal submarines, but as modern submarine tactics developed during World War I, the advantages of rapid construction and portability encouraged development of UB torpedo launching, and UC minelaying coastal submarines in 1915 to operate in the English Channel. These coastal submarines displaced only 15 to 20 percent the weight of a contemporary conventional U-boat, could be built in one-quarter the time it took to complete a conventional U-boat, and be delivered on railway wagons to operating bases in Belgium. Improved versions of UB and UC coastal submarines were devised. Total production of German coastal submarines during World War I was 136 type UB and 95 type UC.

German submarine construction between the world wars began in 1935 with the building of 24 Type II coastal submarines. These coastal U-boats, with another eight completed prior to hostilities, made North Sea combat patrols during the early months of World War II and then served in the Baltic Sea training crews to operate ocean-going submarines. The 30th U-boat Flotilla of six Type II U-boats was transported overland on the Autobahn and then down the Danube for combat patrols in the Black Sea until September 1944.

Examples

 German Type UB I submarine
 German Type UB II submarine
 German Type UB III submarine
 German Type UC I submarine
 German Type UC II submarine
 German Type UC III submarine
 British H-class submarine
 German Type II submarine
 
 German Type XVII submarine
 Type XXIII submarine
 Ha-201-class submarine
 Type 201 submarine
 Type 205 submarine
 Type 206 submarine
 Sang-O-class submarine
 Gotland-class submarine
 Fateh-class submarine
 Andrasta-class submarine

See also
 List of submarine operators
 List of submarine classes in service

Notes

Sources
 
 
 

Submarines by type